This is a list of wars involving the Central African Republic and its antecedents.

References

 
Central African Republic
Wars